Chilo christophi is a species of moth in the family Crambidae described by Stanisław Błeszyński in 1965. It is found in Romania, the southern Ural region, Armenia, Djarkent, Issyk-Kul, Thian-Shan, Kuldja, Amur, Ussuri, northern China and Japan.

The length of the forewings is 14–19 mm.

References

Moths described in 1965
Chiloini
Moths of Japan
Moths of Europe